Asian TV is a Bangladeshi Bengali language satellite and cable television channel owned by the Asian Group of Industries. It began broadcasts on 18 January 2013, with the "Your Channel" slogan. It broadcasts a selection of general entertainment programming.

History 
Asian TV was formed by businessman Harun-ur-Rashid, as part of his Asian Group of Industries, which also includes Asian Radio, Asian Textile, Asian Fabrics, and Asian Yarn Dyeing. The Bangladesh Telecommunication Regulatory Commission granted the channel a license to broadcast in June 2011. The logo of Asian TV was unveiled at the Pan Pacific Sonargaon hotel in Dhaka on 20 June 2012. It launched on 18 January 2013, after months of test transmissions. Asian Radio, its radio sister, also began broadcasting the same day. However, the radio station was later shut down.

Programming
Shortly before its launch, management announced that the station's programming would include "plays, reality shows, musical programmes, talk shows, cartoons etc." It started broadcasting the Bengali dub of Japanese anime series Doraemon in April 2014. Afsan Chowdhury, advisory editor for the Dhaka Courier, described the channel as politically independent, and wrote that it "markets low end entertainment products".

List of programming 
 Bishakha
 Doraemon
 Lag Bhelki Lag
 Ontohin
 Paramparça (title localized as Ayesha Maryam)

See also 
 List of television stations in Bangladesh

References

External links 
 

Television channels in Bangladesh
Television channels and stations established in 2013
2013 establishments in Bangladesh
Mass media in Dhaka